Aisling O'Sullivan (born in Tralee, County Kerry) is an Irish actress.

Career
O'Sullivan attended the Gaiety School of Acting in Dublin and joined the Abbey Theatre in 1991.

Theatre
In 2011 and 2012, she toured Ireland with Druid, playing the titular character in Big Maggie by John B. Keane.

At the National Theatre she played in Liolà, Mutabilitie, and The Cripple of Inishmaan.

Film and television
She played the grieving mother who commits suicide in Six Shooter, playwright Martin McDonagh's Oscar-winning short film.

She is familiar to Irish television audiences as Dr. Cathy Costello from Series 1 to Series 5 in the drama series The Clinic.

Filmography

Film

Television

References

1968 births
Living people
Irish film actresses
Irish stage actresses
Irish television actresses
Actors from County Kerry
People from Tralee